Leo Smit may refer to:

 Leo Smit (American composer) (1921–1999), American composer
 Leo Smit (Dutch composer) (1900–1943), Dutch composer and pianist.

See also
 Smit
 Leo Smith (disambiguation)